Anthony Leonard Platt (born December 28, 1981)  commonly known by his stage name Unk, is an American DJ, hype man, and rapper. Some of his work has featured on the 2K Sports NBA 2K9 game. He is best known for the mid 2000s snap hit "Walk It Out".

Career 
He began spinning records in 1998, and, after meeting DJ Jelly and DJ Montay, joined their DJ entourage, the Southern Style DJs. They performed for high school parties, proms, pep rallies, and other events around the state of Georgia. In 2000, Big Oomp signed Unk to his label, Big Oomp Records. He released the album Beat'n Down Yo Block! in 2006 led by the single "Walk It Out" that reached Billboard Hot 100 top 10. In 2008 he released the album 2econd Season supported by the single "Show Out" to moderate success. In 2009 he suffered health-issues that resulted in a reduced profile. In 2013 he released the single "Have A Toast" followed by "Wait" in 2014, while he continues to tour the college circuit.

Discography

Albums

Studio albums

Mixtapes 
2009: Itsago The Mixtape Vol.1
2009: Smoke On
2009: ATL Off Da Chain

Singles

As lead artist

As featured performer

References

Living people
1982 births
African-American male rappers
African-American DJs
American hip hop DJs
Rappers from Atlanta
Rappers from Georgia (U.S. state)
Southern hip hop musicians
21st-century American rappers
21st-century American male musicians
MNRK Music Group artists
21st-century African-American musicians
20th-century African-American people